The 2010 AFL draft consisted of four opportunities for player acquisitions during the 2010/11 Australian Football League off-season. These were the trade week; held between (5 October and 12 October), the national draft; held on the (18 November), the pre-season draft (7 December) and the rookie draft (also held on 7 December).

Gold Coast Suns concessions 
The Gold Coast Football Club was to join the AFL in 2011, and was provided with several draft concessions, including additional draft selections, early access to recruit 17-year-old players, and access to uncontracted and previously listed players in this offseason. These concessions were similar to those provided to the Greater Western Sydney Giants in the following season.

Gold Coast was permitted to recruit the following players directly, without the need for any draft:
 At the end of 2009, up to twelve 17-year-old players (born 1 January – 30 April 1992), who were too young to enter the 2009 AFL draft. These players were not eligible to play senior AFL football in 2010, and would continue to undergo junior development, either in Sydney or their home state.
 At the end of 2010, up to ten players who were not on an AFL list but had previously nominated for a national draft. Gold Coast could immediately trade any players recruited in this manner.
 At the end of 2010, up to sixteen players who were on an AFL list, but were out of contract at the end of the season. No more than one player recruited from any other club. Clubs who lost players in this manner received compensatory selections in the national draft; the number and value of these selections was determined based on age, contract size, on-field performance and draft order, and may be used in any year between 2011 and 2015.
 At the end of each season between 2010 and 2012 seasons, up to five players recruited from the Queensland zone, and prior to the 2010 draft, up to three players from the Northern Territory zone.

Then, in the drafts, Gold Coast had the following selections:
 In the 2010 national draft, the first selection in each round, and picks No. 2, 3, 5, 7, 9, 11, 13 and 15 in the first round.
 In the 2009 rookie draft, the first five selections.

Gold Coast began with an expanded list size of up to forty-eight senior players and nine rookies, to be gradually reduced to a standard list size of thirty-eight senior players and nine rookies by 2015.

Throughout the 2010 AFL season, much interest surrounded which out-of-contract players would sign with the new Gold Coast Football Club.  Nathan Bock was the first to be announced, followed by Nathan Krakouer and Michael Rischitelli. Campbell Brown and Jarrod Harbrow were the next two to be announced, ending many months of speculation about their move.

On 29 September, after a year of constant speculation and rumour, Geelong star Gary Ablett, Jr. announced that he had signed a five-year deal with the Suns, which will make him the highest paid player in the league.

Then on 7 October, the Gold Coast also signed Collingwood's Josh Fraser and Brisbane's Jared Brennan. Brennan is the second player from the Brisbane Lions to be signed by the Gold Coast. As the Gold Coast were only able to sign one non-contracted player from each club, the Lions had to agree with the deal and work out a fair compensation.

Player movements

Trades
In the lead-up to trade week, Carlton's Sam Jacobs requested to be traded back to a South Australian club and Fremantle's Chris Tarrant returned to Melbourne.  Shaun Grigg and Andrew Walker both requested to be traded from Carlton and Brisbane's Justin Sherman also wanted to leave Brisbane. Daniel Motlop, David Hale, Nathan Djerrkura and Will Thursfield were also mentioned as likely trade targets.

The timing of trade week was adjusted in 2010 to account for the un-contracted player announcements to be made by Gold Coast by Thursday 7 October. Whereas previous trade weeks had run from Monday to Friday, the 2010 trade week was originally scheduled to run from Monday 4 October to Monday 11 October. However, due to the 2010 Grand Final Replay, the start of trade week was delayed until Tuesday 5 October.

Source:AFL trade tracker
Note: the numbering of the draft picks in this trades table is based on the original order prior to draft day. The final numbering of many of these draft picks was adjusted on draft day due to either the insertion of compensation draft picks in the early rounds, or clubs passing in the later rounds.

Retirements and delistings

2010 national draft
The 2010 AFL national draft was held on 18 November at the Gold Coast Convention Centre, the first time in more than a decade that it has been held outside of Melbourne.

2011 pre-season draft
The 2011 AFL Pre-season Draft was held on 7 December 2010.

2011 rookie draft
The 2011 AFL Rookie Draft was held immediately after the Pre-season Draft.  will take part for the first time, having the first eight selections, with the Gold Coast Football Club having selection nine and then the first selection in each subsequent round.

Selections by league
National and Pre-season draft selection totals by leagues:

References

Australian Football League draft
Draft
AFL Draft
AFL Draft
2000s in Queensland
Australian rules football in Queensland
Sport on the Gold Coast, Queensland
Events in Queensland